is a Japanese romantic comedy manga series by Azure Konno. It was serialized in Futabasha's seinen manga magazine Monthly Action from May 2017 to August 2019 and has been collected in five tankōbon volumes. An anime television series adaptation by Seven aired from April to June 2019.

Characters

A teacher who loves gal games. He dreams of being in a harem surrounded by many girls, just like in games. However, he has never been able to get a girlfriend, so those dreams of a harem are still just dreams. Because he is a descendant of the historical Oda Nobunaga with a similar-sounding name (written with different kanji characters), his students call him "Mr. Nobunaga", though it is said that it could be his reincarnation of Oda Nobunaga himself because of the similarity they have.

A 15-year-old girl who came from the Warring States era. She should have been betrothed to Oda Nobunaga in a political marriage, but she time-traveled to the present day. She develops feelings for Nobunaga Oda.

Oda Nobunaga's concubine who was transported from the Warring States era to the present day. She lost her life at the age of 29, but was transported in a younger form to the present. She is aware that she has been reborn and Nobunaga Oda is from another era, and she is shown to have a yandere personality when she sees Nobunaga with another woman.

Mayu is a student of Nobunaga Oda. She fell in love with him before the start of the beginning of the series when he complimented her on her BL artwork. She is a descendant of Onabe, one of the concubines of Oda Nobunaga. While initially shy and timid, when she is touched by Nobunaga, she enters a sort of trance and desires Nobunaga to be physically intimate with her.

Yuri is a teacher who works in the same school in Nobunaga. She is descendant of Jitokuin, one of Oda Nobunaga's concubines, who was also the nurse of Ikoma's daughter. She initially showed no interest in Nobunaga, but after being touched by Nobunaga she is shown to have a growing obsession for him.

Anna is Mayu Biwajima's classmate as well as her best friend.

Ichika is the younger sister of Nobunaga, she lives with her parents.

Anna's brother who likes to cross dress. He is a descendant of Mori Ranmaru, an attendant of Oda Nobunaga's with whom he was physically intimate.

Media

Manga
Nobunaga Teacher's Young Bride, written and illustrated by Azure Konno, was serialized in Futabasha's Monthly Action magazine from May 25, 2017 to August 24, 2019. Five tankōbon volumes were published from November 10, 2017 to October 11, 2019.

Anime
An anime television series adaptation was announced on December 11, 2018. The series was animated by Seven and directed by Tokihiro Sasaki, with Arikura Arika handling series composition, and Takashi Nishikawa designing the characters. The series aired from April 6 to June 22, 2019 on AT-X and Tokyo MX's FutabAnime time slot. Crunchyroll streamed the series.

See also
Koe de Oshigoto! – Another manga series by the same author

References

External links
  
 

2019 anime television series debuts
Anime series based on manga
AT-X (TV network) original programming
Futabasha manga
Romantic comedy anime and manga
Seinen manga
Seven (animation studio)